Parker Farmhouse is a historic farmhouse located at Cazenovia in Madison County, New York.  It was built about 1820 and is a -story rectangular frame residence in a Saltbox form. It was "modernized" in the 1860s, at which time a front verandah was added. Also on the property are two barns, a wagon shed, and corn crib.

It was added to the National Register of Historic Places in 1987.

References

Houses on the National Register of Historic Places in New York (state)
Houses completed in 1820
Houses in Madison County, New York
National Register of Historic Places in Cazenovia, New York